Sebastian is both a given name and a surname. It comes from the Greek name Sebastianos (Σεβαστιανός) meaning "from Sebastia" (Σεβάστεια), which was the name of the city now known as Sivas, located in the central portion of what is now Turkey; in Western Europe the name comes through the Latinized intermediary Sebastianus. The name of the city is derived from the Greek word σεβαστός (sebastos), "venerable", which comes from σέβας (sebas), "awe, reverence, dread", in turn from the verb σέβομαι (sebomai), "feel awe, scruple, be ashamed". Sebastos was the Greek calque of the title Augustus, which was used for Roman emperors. Sebastian became a widely used name because it was the name of Saint Sebastian, a third-century Christian martyr.

Variants 

 Croatian: Sebastijan
 Czech: Sebastián, Šebestián
 Dutch: Bas, Sebastiaan, Bastiaan
 English: Bastian, Seb, Sebby (nicknames)
 Estonian: Sebaastian
 Finnish: Sebastian, Seppo, Sepi (diminutive)
 French: Bastien, Sébastien, Sébastian, Sébastienne (feminine)
 German: Bastian
 Greek: Sebastianos (Σεβαστιανός)
 Hungarian: Sebestyén
 Italian: Sebastiano, Sebastiana (feminine)
 Latin: Sebastianus
 Latvian: Sebastians, Sebastiāns, Sebastjans
 Lithuanian: Sebastijonas
 Malayalam: Devasia, Devassy (ദേവസ്യാ), Sebasthianos
 Maltese: Bastjan
 Polish: Sebastiana (femine), Seba (nickname), Sebix (nickname),  Sebuś (nickname), Sebik (nickname),  Bastek (nickname), Bastuś (nickname), Bastian (nickname)
 Portuguese: Sebastião
 Romanian: Sebastiana (feminine), Seba, Sebi (diminutive)
 Russian: Sevastian (Cyrillic: Севастьян), Sevastyan
 Sicilian: Bastianu
 Slovene: Boštjan, Sebastijan, Sebastjan
 Spanish: Sebastián
 Swahili: Sebastiani
 Swedish: Sebbe (nickname)
 Turkish: Sivaslı
 Vietnamese: Sêbastianô

People

Given name
Sébastien Akchoté-Bozović (born 1981), French musician, also known as SebastiAn
Sebastián Abreu (1976), retired Uruguayan soccer player
Sebastian Aho (born 1996), Swedish ice hockey player
Sebastian Aho (born 1997), Finnish ice hockey player
Sebastian Bach (born 1968), Canadian heavy metal singer, former member of Skid Row
Sebastian Binder (1792–1845), Austrian opera singer
Sebastian Bodu (born 1970), Romanian politician
Sebastián Borensztein (born 1963), Argentine filmmaker
Sebastian Brendel (born 1988), German canoeist
Seb Buddle, Hong Kong professional footballer
Sebastian Cabot (explorer) (c. 1484–1557), originally Sebastiano Caboto, Italian explorer
Sebastian Cabot (1918–1977), British actor
Sebastian Coe (born 1956), British track and field athlete & Conservative Member of Parliament
Sebastian Colloredo (born 1987), Italian ski-jumper
Sebastian Dance (born 1981), British politician
Sebastian Deisler (born 1980), German professional footballer 
Sebastian Edathy (born 1969), German politician 
Sebastian Faulks (born 1953), British author
Sebastian Fiedler (born 1973), German police investigator and politician
Sebastián Francini (born 1989), Argentine actor
Sebastian Fülle (born 1992), German basketball player
Sebastian Fundora (born 1997), American professional boxer 
Sebastian Giovinco (born 1987), Italian footballer
Sebastian Gutierrez (born 1974), Venezuelan film director and producer
Sebastián Gutiérrez (footballer) (born 1997), Colombian footballer
Sebastian Horsley (1962-2010), English artist
Sebastian Ingrosso (born 1983), Swedish D.J. & member of the music group Swedish House Mafia
Sebastian Janikowski (born 1978), Polish-born American NFL football player
Sebastian Joseph (born 1995), American football player
Sebastian Karlsson (born 1985), Swedish singer
Sebastian Kehl (born 1980), German professional footballer 
Sebastián Kindelán y Oregón (1763–1836), Spanish colonel of the Spanish Army
Sebastian Koch (born 1962), German actor 
Sebastian Kurz (born 1986), Austrian politician
Sebastian Maniscalco (born 1973), American stand-up comedian
Sebastián Martínez (disambiguation), several people
Sebastian Melmoth (1854-1900), Oscar Wilde's pseudonym during his exile in France
Sebastian Papaiani (1936-2016), Romanian actor
Sebastian Pasquali (born 1999), Australian professional footballer
Sebastián Piñera (born 1949), Chilean politician and president of Chile 2018–
Sebastián Prieto (born 1975), Argentinian tennis player
Sebastian Prödl (born 1987), Austrian professional footballer
Sebastian Roché (born 1964), French actor
Sebastian Rode (born 1990), German professional footballer
Sebastián Rozental (born 1976), Chilean professional soccer player
Sebastian Rudy (born 1990), German professional footballer
Sebastian Sauve (born 1987), American model
Sebastian Schmitt (born 1996), German basketball player
Sebastian Sebulonsen (born 2000), Norwegian footballer
Sebastian Seeman (born 1966), Indian Tamil film director & actor
Sebastian Sponevik (born 2005), Norwegian artistic gymnast
Sebastian Stan (born 1982), Romanian-American actor
Sebastian Świderski (born 1977), Polish volleyball player
Sebastian Telfair (born 1985), American basketball player
Sebastián Umegido (born 1993), Mexican professional footballer
Sebastián Vázquez (basketball) (born 1985), Uruguayan basketball player
Sebastian Vettel (born 1987), Retired German Formula One Driver
Sebastian Wiese (born 1972), German freestyle swimmer
Sebastian Yatra, Colombian singer, songwriter and actor
Sébastien Bourdais (born 1979), French Indycar driver
Sébastien Loeb (born 1974), French rally car driver
Sebastien Michaelis (1543-1618), French Inquisitor
Sébastien Ogier (born 1983), French rally car driver

Surname
Cuthbert Sebastian (1921–2017), Governor-General of St. Kitts and Nevis from 1996 to 2013
Dorothy Sebastian, American silent film actress
Guy Sebastian, winner of the 2003 (first) series of Australian Idol
Jam Sebastian (1986–2015), Filipino online personality
Jaybee Sebastian (1980–2020), Filipino criminal
Joan Sebastian (1951–2015), Mexican singer-songwriter, actor
John Sebastian (1914−1980), American classical harmonica player and composer
John Sebastian (born 1944), American songwriter, member of the Lovin' Spoonful
Linus Sebastian (born 1986), a Canadian YouTube personality, presenter, producer, and founder of Linus Media Group
Madonna Sebastian, Indian actress and singer 
Mihail Sebastian, Romanian writer
Rita Sebastian (died 1996), Sri Lankan journalist
Robin Sebastian, British actor
Tim Sebastian (born 1952), British journalist
Tim Sebastian (footballer), German defender

Fictional characters
Sebastian (The Little Mermaid), a crab featured in The Little Mermaid (1989) and related works
 Sebastian (Twelfth Night), one of the main characters from William Shakespeare's play Twelfth Night
Sebastian, the true name of the Narrator from the novel and film Fight Club
 Sebastian, Alexandra Cabot's cat in the Josie and the Pussycats comic book cartoon series
Sebastian, freelance programmer and bachelor from the video game Stardew Valley
 Sebastian, Lili De Rochefort's butler in Tekken Tag Tournament 2 and Tekken 5: Dark Resurrection
 Sebastian, in William Shakespeare's play The Tempest
 Sebastian Beach, the butler of Lord Emsworth and his family in the Blandings stories by P. G. Wodehouse 
Sebastian Becker, main character in the Sebastian Becker series of novels by Stephen Gallagher - The Kingdom of Bones (2007), The Bedlam Detective (2012) and The Authentic William James (2016)
Bastian Balthazar Bux, lead in The Neverending Story series
 Sebastian Castellanos, main character in The Evil Within series
Sebastian "Bash" de Poitiers, in the television series Reign
Sebastian De Rosa, in the Alien vs. Predator
 Lord Sebastian Flyte, in Evelyn Waugh's novel Brideshead Revisited
Sebastian Hawks from Mike Leigh's movie Naked (1993)
Sebastian Kydd, Carrie's love interest in The Carrie Diaries
Sebastian LaCroix, leader of the L.A Camarilla in the video game Vampire: The Masquerade – Bloodlines
Sebastian "Bash" Lacroix, main character in the Canadian television show Anne with an E (2017-2019)
Sebastian Matthew-Smith from the Disney+ mockumentary High School Musical: The Musical: The Series
 Sebastian Michaelis, the demonic butler from the manga and anime Kuroshitsuji
 Sebastian Milton, character and antagonist of the Walking Dead, who murdered the protagonist Rick Grimes
Bass Monroe, nickname of Sebastian Monroe, the fictional President in Revolution
Colonel Sebastian Moran, a Sherlock Holmes villain
Hector Sebastian, fictional writer, narrator of later episodes of the Three Investigators
J.F. Sebastian from Blade Runner (1982) 
Mr. Sebastian, codebreaker in the film Sebastian (1968)
 Serena Sebastian, English name of the anime character Sonoko Suzuki in the English adaptations of Detective Conan (Case Closed)
 Sebastian Shaw (comics), supervillain from Marvel Comics
 Sebastian Smythe, recurring character in the 3rd and 4th season of Glee
Sebas Tian, head butler in the anime and light novel Overlord
Sebastian Vael, Prince of Starkhaven in Dragon Age II
 Sebastian Valmont, in the film Cruel Intentions (1999) 
 Sebastian Verlac, in Cassandra Clare's The Mortal Instruments series novel City of Glass
Sebastian Wilder, in the film La La Land (2016)
 a title character of Belle et Sébastien, a 1965 novel, and various film and television adaptations
 the title character of Sebastian Star Bear: First Mission, a 1991 Dutch animated film

Mascots
 Sebastian the Ibis, the mascot of the University of Miami

References 

Czech masculine given names
Danish masculine given names 
English masculine given names
German masculine given names
Norwegian masculine given names
Romanian masculine given names
Spanish masculine given names
Swedish masculine given names